Inermocoelotes halanensis is a funnel-web spider species found in Croatia.

See also 
 List of Agelenidae species

References 

Inermocoelotes
Spiders of Europe
Spiders described in 2010